The 24th annual Billboard Latin Music Awards which honor the most popular albums, songs, and performers in Latin music took place in Miami.

Artist of the Year
 J Balvin
 Juan Gabriel—WINNER
 Los Plebes del Rancho de Ariel Camacho
 Nicky Jam

Artist of the Year, New
    CNCO—WINNER
    Crecer Germán
    Ozuna
    Ulíces Chaidez y Sus Plebes

Tour of the Year
    Julión Álvarez y Su Norteño Banda 
    Maná
    Marc Anthony—WINNER
    Marco Antonio Solís

Social Artist of the Year
    Enrique Iglesias    
    Jennifer Lopez—WINNER
    Maluma
    Shakira

Crossover Artist of the Year
    Calvin Harris 
    Drake
    Justin Bieber—WINNER
    Rihanna

Hot Latin Song of the Year
    Carlos Vives & Shakira, "La Bicicleta"
    Daddy Yankee, "Shaky Shaky"
    Enrique Iglesias feat. Wisin, "Duele El Corazón"
    Nicky Jam, "Hasta El Amanecer"—WINNER

Hot Latin Song of the Year, Vocal Event
    Carlos Vives & Shakira, "La Bicicleta"
    Enrique Iglesias feat. Wisin, "Duele El Corazón"—WINNER
    Farruko feat. Ky-Mani Marley, "Chillax"
    Shakira feat. Maluma, "Chantaje"

Hot Latin Songs Artist of the Year, Male
    Daddy Yankee
    J Balvin
    Maluma
    Nicky Jam—WINNER

Hot Latin Songs Artist of the Year, Female
    Becky G
    Jennifer Lopez
    Shakira—WINNER
    Thalía

Hot Latin Songs Artist of the Year, Duo or Group
    Banda Sinaloense MS De Sergio Lizárraga—WINNER
    La Arrolladora Banda el Limón de René Camacho 
    Los Plebes del Rancho de Ariel Camacho
    Zion & Lennox

Hot Latin Songs Label of the Year
    DEL    
    Sony Music Latin—WINNER
    Universal Music Latin Entertainment
    Warner Latina

Hot Latin Songs Imprint of the Year
    Capitol Latin
    DEL
    Fonovisa
    Sony Music Latin—WINNER

Airplay Song of the Year
    Carlos Vives & Shakira, "La Bicicleta"
    Enrique Iglesias feat. Wisin, "Duele el Corazón"—WINNER
    Nicky Jam, "Hasta El Amanecer"
    Prince Royce, "La Carretera"

Airplay Label of the Year
    Lizos
    Sony Music Latin—WINNER
    Universal Music Latin Entertainment
    Warner Latina

Airplay Imprint of the Year
    Disa
    Fonovisa
    Sony Music Latin—WINNER
    Warner Latina

Digital Song of the Year
    Carlos Vives & Shakira, "La Bicicleta"
    Enrique Iglesias feat. Wisin, "Duele el Corazón"
    Nicky Jam, "Hasta El Amanecer"—WINNER
    Pitbull feat. Sensato, Lil Jon & Osmani Garcia, "El Taxi"

Streaming Song of the Year
    Ariel Camacho y Los Plebes del Rancho, "Te Metiste"
    Daddy Yankee, "Shaky Shaky"
    Enrique Iglesias feat. Wisin, "Duele el Corazón"
    Nicky Jam, "Hasta El Amanecer"—WINNER

Top Latin Album of the Year
    Banda Sinaloense MS de Sergio Lizárraga, Que Bendición
    Juan Gabriel, Los Dúo 2 -- WINNER
    Juan Gabriel, Vestido de Etiqueta: Por Eduardo Magallanes
    Los Plebes del Rancho de Ariel Camacho, Recuerden Mi Estilo

Latin Compilation Album of the Year
    Varios/Various, 20 Bandazos de Oro: Puros Éxitos
    Varios/Various, De Puerto Rico Para El Mundo
    Varios/Various, Las Bandas Románticas de América 2016—WINNER
    Varios/Various, Latin Hits 2016: Club Edition

Top Latin Albums Artist of the Year, Male
    J Balvin
    Joan Sebastian
    Juan Gabriel—WINNER
    Marco Antonio Solís

Top Latin Albums Artist of the Year, Female
    Ana Gabriel
    Jenni Rivera
    Selena—WINNER
    Thalía

Top Latin Albums Artist of the Year, Duo or Group
    Banda Sinaloense MS De Sergio Lizárraga
    Calibre 50
    Julión Álvarez y Su Norteño Banda
    Los Plebes del Rancho de Ariel Camacho—WINNERTop Latin Albums Label of the Year
    DEL
    Lizos
    Sony Music Latin
    Universal Music Latin Entertainment—WINNERTop Latin Albums Imprint of the Year
    DEL
    Disa
    Fonovisa—WINNER    Sony Music Latin

Latin Pop Song of the Year
    Carlos Vives & Shakira, "La Bicicleta"
    Chino & Nacho feat. Daddy Yankee, "Andas En Mi Cabeza"
    Enrique Iglesias feat. Wisin, "Duele el Corazón"—WINNER    Reik & Nicky Jam, "Ya Me Enteré"

Latin Pop Songs Artist of the Year, Solo
    Carlos Vives
    Enrique Iglesias—WINNER    Ricky Martin
    Shakira

Latin Pop Songs Artist of the Year, Duo or Group
    Chino & Nacho
    CNCO—WINNER    Jesse & Joy
    Sin Bandera

Latin Pop Airplay Label of the Year
    Mr. 305
    Sony Music Latin—WINNER    Universal Music Latin Entertainment
    Warner Latina

Latin Pop Airplay Imprint of the Year
    Capitol Latin
    Sony Music Latin—WINNER    Universal Music Latino
    Warner Latina

Latin Pop Album of the Year
    CNCO, Primera Cita
    Juan Gabriel, Los Dúo 2 -- WINNER    Juan Gabriel, Vestido Por Etiqueta Por Eduardo Magallanes
    Selena, Lo Mejor de...

Latin Pop Albums Artist of the Year, Solo
    Ana Gabriel
    Juan Gabriel—WINNER    Marco Antonio Solís
    Selena

Latin Pop Albums Artist of the Year, Duo or Group
    CNCO—WINNER    Il Divo
    Jesse & Joy
    Reik

Latin Pop Albums Label of the Year
    Columbia
    Sony Music Latin
    Universal Music Latin Entertainment—WINNER    Warner Latina

Latin Pop Albums Imprint of the Year
    Capitol Latin
    Fonovisa—WINNER    Sony Music Latin
    Universal Music Latino

Tropical Song of the Year
    Deorro feat. Pitbull & Elvis Crespo, "Bailar"—WINNER    Gente de Zona feat. Marc Anthony, "Traidora"
    Prince Royce, "La Carretera"
    Victor Manuelle & Yandel, "Imaginar"

Tropical Songs Artist of the Year, Solo
    Elvis Crespo
    Marc Anthony
    Prince Royce—WINNER    Romeo Santos

Tropical Songs Artist of the Year, Duo or Group
    24 Horas
    Chiquito Team Band
    Gente de Zona—WINNER    Grupo Niche

Tropical Songs Airplay Label of the Year
    LP
    ParkEast
    Sony Music Latin—WINNER    Universal Music Latin Entertainment

Tropical Songs Airplay Imprint of the Year
    Capitol Latin
    Sony Music Latin—WINNER    Universal Music Latino
    Warner Latina

Tropical Album of the Year
    Aventura, Todavía Me Amas: Lo Mejor de Aventura
    El Gran Combo de Puerto Rico, Alunizando
    Gente de Zona, Visualízate—WINNER    La Tribu de Abrante, Otro Formato de Música

Tropical Albums Artist of the Year, Solo
    Diego "El Cigala"
    Manny Manuel
    Marc Anthony—WINNER    Victor Manuelle

Tropical Albums Artist of the Year, Duo or Group
    Aventura
    El Gran Combo de Puerto Rico
    Gente de Zona—WINNER    La Tribu de Abrante

Sello Discográfico del Año, "Tropical Albums" Tropical Albums Label of the Year
    EGC
    Planet Records
    Sony Music Latin—WINNER    Universal Music Latin Entertainment

Tropical Albums Imprint of the Year
    Magnus
    Planet Records
    Premium Latin
    Sony Music Latin—WINNERRegional Mexican Song of the Year
    Banda Sinaloense MS de Sergio Lizárraga, "Me Vas A Extrañar"
    Banda Sinaloense MS de Sergio Lizárraga, "Solo Con Verte"—WINNER    La Arrolladora Banda el Limón de René Camacho, "Me Va A Pesar"
    Regulo Caro, "Cicatriiices"

Regional Mexican Songs Artist of the Year, Solo
    Adriel Favela
    Gerardo Ortiz—WINNER    Regulo Caro
    Remmy Valenzuela

Regional Mexican Songs Artist of the Year, Duo or Group
    Banda Sinaloense MS de Sergio Lizárraga—WINNER    Calibre 50
    La Arrolladora Banda El Limón de René Camacho
    Los Plebes del Rancho de Ariel Camacho

Regional Mexican Airplay Label of the Year
    DEL
    Lizos
   Sony Music Latin
    Universal Music Latin Entertainment—WINNERRegional Mexican Airplay Imprint of the Year
    DEL
    Disa
    Fonovisa—WINNER    Lizos

Regional Mexican Album of the Year
    Banda Sinaloense MS de Sergio Lizárraga, Que Bendición
    Julión Álvarez y Su Norteño Banda, Lecciones Para El Corazón
    Julión Álvarez y Su Norteño Banda, Mis Ídolos, Hoy Mis Amigos!!!
    Los Plebes del Rancho de Ariel Camacho, Recuerden Mi Estilo—WINNERRegional Mexican Albums Artist of the Year, Solo
    Espinoza Paz
    Jenni Rivera
    Joan Sebastian—WINNER   Vicente Fernández

Regional Mexican Albums Artist of the Year, Duo or Group
    Banda Sinaloense MS de Sergio Lizárraga
    Calibre 50 
    Julión Álvarez y Su Norteño Banda
    Los Plebes del Rancho de Ariel Camacho—WINNERRegional Mexican Albums Label of the Year
    DEL
    Lizos
    Sony Music Latin
    Universal Music Latin Entertainment—WINNERRegional Mexican Albums Imprint of the Year
    DEL
    Disa
    Fonovisa—WINNER    Lizos

Latin Rhythm Song of the Year
    Farruko Feat. Ky-Mani Marley, "Chillax"
    J Balvin, "Bobo"
    Maluma feat. Yandel, "El Perdedor"
    Nicky Jam, "Hasta El Amanecer"—WINNERLatin Rhythm Songs Artist of the Year, Solo
    J Balvin
    Maluma
    Nicky Jam—WINNER    Yandel

Latin Rhythm Songs Artist of the Year, Duo or Group
    Alexis & Fido
    Plan B
    Play-N-Skillz
    Zion & Lennox—WINNERCNCO

Latin Rhythm Airplay Label of the Year
    Mr. 305
    Sony Music Latin—WINNER    Universal Music Latin Entertainment
    Warner Latina

Latin Rhythm Airplay Imprint of the Year
    Capitol Latin
    La Industria
    Sony Music Latin—WINNER    Warner Latina

Latin Rhythm Album of the Year
    Farruko, Visionary
    J Balvin, Energía—WINNER    Maluma, Pretty Boy Dirty Boy
    Yandel, Dangerous

Latin Rhythm Albums Artist of the Year, Solo
    Farruko
    J Balvin—WINNER    Maluma
    Pitbull

Latin Rhythm Albums Artist of the Year, Duo or Group
    Cartel de Santa
    Plan B
    Yomil Y El Dany
    Zion & Lennox—WINNERLatin Rhythm Albums Label of the Year
    Rich
    Sony Music Latin—WINNER    Universal Music Latin Entertainment
    Warner Latina

Latin Rhythm Albums Imprint of the Year
    Capitol Latin—WINNER    Pina
    Sony Music Latin
    Universal Music Latino

Songwriter of the Year
    Edén Muñoz
    Horacio Palencia Cisneros—WINNER    Luciano Luna Díaz
    Raymond Luis "Daddy Yankee" Ayala Rodríguez
Ozuna

Publisher of the Year
    DEL World Songs, ASCAP—WINNER    Dulce Maria Music, LLC, SESAC
    Sony/ATV Discos Music Publishing LLC, ASCAP
    Sony/ATV Latin Music Publishing, LLC, BMI

Publishing Corporation of the Year
    BMG
    Sony/ATV Music—WINNER    Universal Music
    Warner/Chappell Music

Producer of the Year
    Alejandro "Sky" Suárez Ramírez
    Jesus Jaime González Terrazas
    Saga Whiteblack—WINNER    Sergio Lizarraga

Billboard Lifetime achievement awardRicardo ArjonaSpirit Of HopeLuis FonsiStar AwardJennifer Lopez'''

References

Billboard Latin Music Awards
Latin Billboard Music Awards
Latin Billboard Music Awards
Latin Billboard Music Awards
Latin Billboard Music